Sharon Moriwaki is an American Democratic party politician from Hawaii. She is a state senator from Senate District 12.

Early life and education 
Moriwaki was born in Honolulu and attended Kaimuki High School, the University of Southern California, and Loyola Law School.

Career 
After graduating from law school, Moriwaki returned to Hawaii and worked at a private law firm. She then became the Labor Department's deputy director under Governor John Waihee. She went on to serve in several other government positions before being elected to office in 2018. She is a member of the Housing, Technology, and Ways and Means committees.

References

External links 
Official website

1945 births
Living people
University of Southern California alumni
Loyola Law School alumni
Democratic Party Hawaii state senators
Politicians from Honolulu
21st-century American politicians